Kanggye is the provincial capital of Chagang, North Korea and has a population of 251,971. Because of its strategic importance, derived from its topography, it has been of military interest from the time of the Joseon Dynasty (1392-1910).

History
In December 1949, Kanggye-myon was promoted to Kanggye-si.

During the Korean War, after being driven from Pyongyang, Kim Il Sung and his government temporarily moved the capital to Kanggye after first moving temporarily to Sinuiju. The city was firebombed in November 1950 on American general Douglas MacArthur's orders after the Chinese People's Volunteer Army turned the course of the war; at least 65% of the city was destroyed. The following month Kim presided over a plenum of the cabinet at Kanggye, where he assigned blame for what he claimed were military failures during the losing phase of the war.

Workers' Party general secretary Kim Jong-il toured facilities at Kanggye and the surrounding area in January 1998 amid the North Korean famine. Impressed by the people's success in building minor power stations and improving factories despite hardships, he urged other provinces to emulate the "Kanggye spirit."

Geography
Kanggye gets its name, "river junction," from the Changja River, which flows through the city, and two tributaries. The city is located in a basin, and is hence surrounded by mountains. The main mountain ranges are the Nangnim and Gangnam.

Climate
Kanggye has a humid continental climate (Köppen climate classification: Dwa).

Administrative divisions

Kanggye is divided into 34 tong (neighbourhoods) and two ri (villages):

Transportation
Kanggye is a transportation hub, connected to other cities by road, rail and air. It lies at the junction of the Kanggye and Manp'o Lines. Commuter trains run on the Manpo line between Kanggye and Ssangbangdong stations. In addition, highways connect it to Pyongyang and other locations, with the road network of Chagang province being centered on the city. The city is located near a military and civilian dual-purpose air station. 

Kanggye has a trolleybus system, opened on April 17, 1992, with one 12 km line running from Changja-dong to Kong'in-dong, following the embankment of the Changja and Puchon rivers. Up until 2009 it had 6 full length and 2 medium trolleybuses; in the 2010s 5 full length and 1 medium trolleybus remained. In 2020, the northern loop was built into a small depot.

Broadcasting
A local radio station called "Kanggye Broadcasting (Korean: 강계방송)", originally founded in 1947 as a local broadcasting station for North Pyongan Province, which later became a local broadcasting station for Chagang Province in 1949. It is operated by the Chagang Province Broadcasting Committee (Korean: 자강도 방송위원회). It airs programs that covering topics such as ideological education or local weather information.

Culture
Kanggye University of Education, Kanggye University of Technology, and the Kanggye University of Medicine are located in the city.

Places of tourist interest include Inphung Pavilion and Mount Ryonhwa. Tourist attractions have been developed to show the mountainous nature of the city.

The city has more than 50 various medical centres including an oral care and a maternity hospital.

Economy
From 1945, the manufacturing industry developed rapidly.

Kanggye has a mining industry producing copper, zinc ore, coal and graphite.

Kanggye hosts one of the main timber processing factories of Chagang province and North Korea. The city has various light industry along with production of construction, electrical and precision machinery. The pencils produced, which are also exported, have 'national significance'. The city also has agricultural, fruit, vegetable and livestock production.

Electricity production 
The city has a large number of hydropower plants due to its location near a number of rivers. The first hydropower station in a series of them is called Hungju No.1 Youth Power Station, is located 3.5 km north of Kanggye. It is supported by the Ryongrim dam, which does not have a power station attached to it. This allows a careful management of the water level to ensure efficient operation. This is followed by the Hungju Youth Power Station No. 2 and 3. No.2 was completed in 2007 and No.3 was completed by February 2019,   fitted with three generator turbines.

There are also a series of four small scale hydropower plants on the Pukchon river.

No.26 General Plant

The No.26 factory is the largest underground military facility in Korea. The plant manufactures ammunition which has been exported to Libya, Syria, Iran, Iraq and Egypt. It employs more than 20,000 workers and can produce 126,000 mortar rounds and 1.76 million rounds of rifle ammunition per year. On November 30, 1991, up to a thousand people were allegedly killed after a massive explosion at the plant. South Korean sources put the number of fatalities at six times that amount or more based on the claims of survivors of the incident.

See also

Geography of North Korea
List of cities in North Korea

References

Further reading
Dormels, Rainer. North Korea's Cities: Industrial facilities, internal structures and typification. Jimoondang, 2014.

External links

City profile of Kanggye 

Cities in Chagang